The 2015 Argentine Primera División or Torneo de Primera División 2015 "Julio H. Grondona" was the 125th season of top-flight professional football in Argentina. The season began on February 13 and ended on December 6.  Thirty teams competed in the league, twenty returning from the 2014 Torneo de Transición and ten promoted from the 2014 Primera B Nacional (Aldosivi, Argentinos Juniors, Colón, Crucero del Norte, Huracán, Nueva Chicago, San Martín (SJ), Sarmiento, Temperley and Unión). No teams were relegated to the Primera B Nacional Championship in the previous tournament.

Competition format

Each of the 30 teams plays the other sides once, along with an extra derby game, for a total of 30 matches for each side.

The winners and runners-up of the first division qualified for the 2016 Copa Libertadores. Additionally, the winner of the 2015 Copa Argentina earned the Argentina 3 berth to the Copa Libertadores. The teams that place third to sixth in the league table advanced to the Liguilla Pre-Libertadores. The winner of this Liguilla earned the fourth berth to the Copa Libertadores, with the runner-up entering the 2016 Copa Sudamericana. The teams that place seventh to eighteenth in addition to the losing semifinalists of the Liguilla Pre-Libertadores advanced to the Liguilla Pre-Sudamericana, to determine the six berths for the 2016 Copa Sudamericana.

Club information

Stadia and locations

Managerial changes 

Interim Managers
1. Interim manager, but later promoted to full-time manager.
2. Interim manager, but later promoted to full-time manager.
3.  Gustavo Tognarelli was interim manager in the 9th round.
4.  Alejandro Giuntini was interim manager in the 10th.
5.  Nelson Vivas was interim manager in the 10th round.
6.  Roberto Santiago González was interim manager in the suspended 7th round and 11th–12th rounds.
7.  Miguel Ángel Salinas was interim manager in the 11th round.
8.  Fernando Berón was interim manager in the 14th and 15th rounds.
9.  Carlos Picerni was interim manager in the 15th round.
10. Interim manager.
11. Interim manager in the suspended 22nd round and 27th–30th rounds.

Notable occurrences
 On January 25, Juan Román Riquelme announced his retirement from professional football, just one month after leading first club Argentinos Juniors back to the Primera División. Riquelme made his debut in 1996 and until his retirement played for Boca Juniors, Barcelona, Villarreal and Argentinos Juniors.
 On March 15, A San Lorenzo supporter died from injuries sustained at the end of the derby against Huracán (3–1, 5th round) after he lost his balance and fell from the highest point of the uncovered home stand behind the goal.
 On March 22, during the match San Martín (SJ)–Boca Juniors a tackle by Boca Juniors goalkeeper Agustín Orión resulted in a broken tibia and fibula in the right leg (from six to eight-month recovery) for San Martin's Carlos Bueno. Orión received a straight red card and got four-match ban.
 On March 30, the referee Ariel Penel suspended after 30 minutes the match between Arsenal and Aldosivi (0–1) due to disturbances outside the Estadio Julio Humberto Grondona. The match was finished on April 25 with final score 0–3.
 On April 4, the referee Germán Delfino awarded a penalty to Vélez Sarsfield after Daniel Rosero (Arsenal) was adjudged to have handled the ball in the area and showed his second booking of the game. As the penalty was about to be taken Delfino was told over his intercom that the handball was by Vélez Sarsfield striker Mariano Pavone and proceeded to overturn his decision and call Rosero back onto the field. Apparently the decision was overturned after linesman Iván Núñez caught a replay of the incident on a nearby cameraman's monitor and informed Delfino via his earpiece. Despite the correct decision was awarded by the referee, the video technology is not allowed in Argentine football and Delfino was banned one round.
 On May 21, The AFA's Disciplinary Tribunal gave the victory to Newell's Old Boys over Arsenal (0−1) for fielding an ineligible player. Arsenal were charged after they played the suspended midfielder Leandro Godoy in their 3−0 win over Newell's Old Boys on April 13 (9th round).
 On May 24, AFA suspended the match between Tigre and River Plate because of the death of Cristian Gómez, a player of second division football club Paraná, who died after collapsing on the pitch during a game.

League table

Results 
Teams play every other team once (either at home or away), and play one additional round against their local derby rival (or assigned match by AFA if a club doesn't have derby), completing a total of 30 rounds.

Liguilla Pre Libertadores
The Liguilla Pre Libertadores is contested by the four best placed teams from the league that have not already qualified for the Copa Libertadores, with the winners gaining a place in the 2016 tournament and the runners-up playing in the Copa Sudamericana. The losing semi-finalists play in the Liguilla Pre Sudamericana.

Semi-finals

Final

First leg

Second leg

Racing won 3–2 on aggregate and qualified to 2016 Copa Libertadores. Independiente qualified to 2016 Copa Sudamericana.

Liguilla Pre Sudamericana
The Liguilla Pre Sudamericana is contested by the twelve best placed teams from the league that have not already qualified for the Copa Libertadores, plus the two losing semi-finalists from the Liguilla Pre Libertadores. The four winners of the finals qualify for the 2016 Copa Sudamericana.

Semi-finals

Finals

Match 1

Match 2

Match 3

Match 4

The four sides who won their ties on aggregate qualified for 2016 Copa Sudamericana.

Season statistics

Top goalscorers

Top assists

Source: AFA

Relegation

Source: AFA

See also
2015 Primera B Nacional

References

External links
Full fixture list
soccerway.com

1
Argentine Primera División seasons